The 2009–10 Cayman Islands Premier League season was the 31st season of top-tier football in the Cayman Islands. It began on 27 September 2009 and ended on 1 May 2010. Elite were the reigning champions, having won their 1st league title last season.

Teams
Latinos FC were relegated to the Cayman Islands First Division after failing to meet certain requirements of the football association instead of Roma United. Taking their place in the competition were the champions of the First Division, Bodden Town FC.

Standings

Relegation playoff

Season statistics

Top goalscorers

Source: caymanactive.com

References

External links
Official Site

Cayman Islands Premier League seasons
1
Cayman